The speckled moray, or Griffin's moray (Gymnothorax obesus) is a moray eel of the genus Gymnothorax, found in Australia and around the offshore islands off Northland and the Bay of Plenty in the North Island of New Zealand at depths down to 100 m, in reef areas of broken rock.  Their length is between 40 and 200 cm.

References

 
 
 Tony Ayling & Geoffrey Cox, Collins Guide to the Sea Fishes of New Zealand,  (William Collins Publishers Ltd, Auckland, New Zealand 1982) 

obesus
Fish described in 1932